Osuofia in London is a 2003 Nigerian comedy film produced and directed by Kingsley Ogoro, starring Nkem Owoh. The film is arguably one of the highest selling Nollywood films in history. It was followed by 2004 sequel titled Osuofia in London 2.

Plot summary 
Osuofia (played by Nkem Owoh) is a foolish villager living in Nigeria, who received word of his brother's demise, Donatus (played by Francis Odega) in London. However, in his will, Donatus has left Osuofia with his huge estate as the sole beneficiary. Osuofia made his way to London only to find out that his late brother's English fiancée, Samantha (played by Mara Derwent) is not quite sure herself, about the Nigerian's tradition (i.e., Osuofia being a benefactor of his brother's properties). Cultural misunderstandings resulted in a comedy of errors.

Cast
Nkem Owoh
Mara Derwent
Charles Angiama 
Cynthia Okereke 
Victoria Summers
Francis Odega
Sebastian Hall
Rosa Nicholson-Ellis
Lucie Bond
Alessandro Sanguinetti
Ester Lauren

See also
 List of Nigerian films of 2003

References

External links

2003 films
2003 comedy-drama films
Nigerian comedy-drama films
English-language Nigerian films
Igbo-language films
Best Soundtrack Africa Movie Academy Award winners
2003 comedy films
2003 drama films
Nigerian sequel films
2000s English-language films